The following are the national records in athletics in Austria maintained by its national athletics federation, the Austrian Athletics Federation (ÖLV).

Outdoor

Key to tables:

+ = en route to a longer distance

h = hand timing

Men

Women

Indoor

Men

Women

Notes

References

External links
ÖLV web site
Austrian Records web site

Austria
Records
Athletics
Athletics